The NCAA college baseball rankings consist of a series of human polls which rank the top teams in college baseball from the preseason until after the College World Series.  The Coaches Poll is voted by a panel of 31 coaches, all of whom are members of the American Baseball Coaches Association, and is published by USA Today beginning in the preseason, and then weekly after the second week of the regular season.  Baseball America also publishes a ranking, which is voted by its staff members, and appears from the preseason through the end of the season.  Collegiate Baseball Newspaper published the first poll of college baseball teams in 1959, and ranks the top 40 teams in the preseason and top 30 teams during the regular season and postseason.  The National Collegiate Baseball Writers Association, or NCBWA, has, since 1998, published a ranking of the top 35 teams in the preseason and top 30 during the regular season and postseason, as voted by 40 of its members.

NCAA Division I poll seasons (1959–present)

References

 
Rankings